The Virgin and Child with Saint Paul and Saint Francis is a 1508-1530 oil on poplar panel. It was previously attributed to Cima da Conegliano but now thought to be by one of his studio assistants, possibly using workshop drawings by the artist himself, since all four figures appear in autograph works by the painter. It is now in the National Gallery, London.

References

Collections of the National Gallery, London
Paintings of Francis of Assisi
Paintings depicting Paul the Apostle